This is a list of SpongeBob SquarePants merchandise, including home videos and DVDs, CDs, video games, books, and toys.

Home video releases

Season boxsets

Other boxsets

Themed DVDs

VHS releases

Blockbuster VHS releases

Other releases including SpongeBob SquarePants episodes

Games

Video games

Board and card games

 SpongeBob SquarePants Trading Card Game
 Monopoly SpongeBob SquarePants Edition
 Uno 
 SpongeBob SquarePants
 SpongeBob SquarePants: Special Edition
 SpongeBob SquarePants: Lost in Time
 SpongeBob SquarePants: Eye-Eye Game
 SpongeBob SquarePants: My First
 The Game of Life Bikini Bottom SpongeBob SquarePants Edition
 Hangman SpongeBob Edition
 Ants in the Pants SpongeBob Edition (Ants in the Square Pants)
 Operation SpongeBob Edition
 Connect Four SpongeBob Edition
 Sorry! SpongeBob SquarePants Edition
 Cranium SpongeBob SquarePants
 SpongeBob SquarePants: Memory Game
 SpongeBob SquarePants Game
 Great Jellyfish Escape
 A Wacky Race to the Krusty Krab
 The clam catch
 Guess Who? SpongeBob SquarePants Edition

DVD games
 SpongeBob SquarePants Fact or Fishy
 Scene It? Nickelodeon Edition

Albums

Books

8x8 series

Chapter book series

Cine-manga series

Ready-to-Read series

The SpongeBob SquarePants Movie series

SpongeBob SquarePants Stickerbooks

There are at least 8 more sticker albums not listed

Toys

Leapfrog books and games
 SpongeBob SquarePants Saves the Day (Leapster)
 SpongeBob SquarePants: Fists of Foam (Didj and Leapster Explorer)
 SpongeBob SquarePants: The Tour de Bikini Bottom (Tag)
 SpongeBob SquarePants: Through the Wormhole (Leapster)
 SpongeBob SquarePants: The Clam Prix (Leapster Explorer)
 SpongeBob SquarePants: Salty Sea Stories (LeapPad)

TY Beanie Babies
 Captain SpongeBob
 First Mate Patrick
 Gary the Snail
 Mr. Krabs
 Muscle Man Star
 MuscleBob BuffPants
 Patrick Barnacleboy
 Patrick Claus
 Patrick Star Best Day Ever
 Sheldon J. Plankton
 SpongeBob Best Day Ever
 SpongeBob Birthday
 SpongeBob FrankenStein
 SpongeBob JingleBells
 SpongeBob JollyElf
 SpongeBob Mermaidman
 SpongeBob PinkPants
 SpongeBob PumpkinMask
 SpongeBob QB
 SpongeBob SleighRide
 SpongeBob SquarePants
 SpongeBob ThumbsUp
 SpongeBob TuxedoPants
 Squidward Tentacles

Lego SpongeBob SquarePants

From 2006 to 2012, Lego sets based on SpongeBob SquarePants were produced.

Masterpiece Memes 
In April 2019, Nickelodeon released Masterpiece Memes, a series of toys adapted from various SpongeBob Internet memes.

References

Merchandise
SpongeBob SquarePants